Simphiwe Mosia Boy-Boy (1 July 1985 – 23 July 2016), better known as Boy-Boy Mosia, was a South African footballer. Mosia died after suddenly falling ill and collapsing while with friends on 23 July 2016, aged 31.

Career 
He began his career in 1994 with MG Stars, and in 1999 he was scouted by Juventus, where he played for a year in Italy. After the year he left Italy and moved back to South Africa where he  signed a contract with Amazulu. In 2001, he left the club and moved to the Transnet Sport School of Excellence in Johannesburg. In January 2003 he was scouted by Chelsea F.C., where he left after just 7 months and moved to K.V.C. Westerlo.

The quick paced winger played for the Chelsea reserve team, and also had trials at Manchester United. In 2004, he played for K.V.C. Westerlo until he was loaned to Oud-Heverlee Leuven in the 2007-08 season in the Belgian Second Division.

On 28 November 2008, Mosia signed a six-month contract with Mpumalanga Black Aces of the PSL, before leaving the club only a month later due to the "lack of professionalism" at the club.

At 155 cm, Mosia was the smallest player in the Belgian First Division during the 2005-06 season.

External links
 Footgoal.net profile

References 

1985 births
2016 deaths
Soccer players from Pretoria
South African soccer players
South African expatriate soccer players
Cape Town Spurs F.C. players
Orlando Pirates F.C. players
Mpumalanga Black Aces F.C. players
K.V.C. Westerlo players
Oud-Heverlee Leuven players
K.F.C. Dessel Sport players
South African expatriate sportspeople in Belgium
Belgian Pro League players
Challenger Pro League players
Expatriate footballers in Belgium
Association football midfielders